Qeshlaq-e Yilatan may refer to:
Qeshlaq-e Yilatan Hajj Abbas
Qeshlaq-e Yilatan ol Hurdi Dowlat